Deadly Games is an American action science fiction television series that aired on UPN from September 5, 1995, to January 9, 1996. The basic plot of the show is about video game characters that come to life, re-enacting their deadly plans for wanton destruction and world domination in the real world. The series was produced by Viacom Productions. Much was made that Leonard Nimoy was executive producer, creative consultant and directed the pilot.

Plot
The first episode introduces the protagonist, Dr. Gus Lloyd, an Antimatter physicist, engineer and video game designer who has created a live-action game in his spare time to exert his indignant feelings about his recent divorce and all the people in his life who have all made his life hell on Earth (his father, his ex-wife's mother, his ex-wife's divorce lawyer, his ex-girlfriend, his former employer, a high school football-Quarterback bully, his old camp counselor, etc.); the villains of the game are modeled after all these people. The master villain is Jackal, who is a combination of the devil and Gus' father. The Jackal wears a vanilla-white ice cream suit and drives a Chrysler convertible to match.

The hero is "The Cold-Steel Kid," a warrior trying to save the dying world, dons commando wear and is naturally modeled after Gus himself, and the sometimes helplessly captive, sometimes active heroine ingenue The Kid is always trying to rescue — "The Girl" — is based on Lauren Ashborne, Gus' ex-wife (wearing the kind of dress of a "Damsel in distress").

In an accident involving an experimental laboratory project, Jackal and the villains step out of the game and into the real world to cause the apocalyptic carnage and domination they were programmed to for the game.

Each week, one of the villains tries to carry out an evil plot according to the rules of the video game, and Gus, Lauren, and Gus' friend Peter Rucker try to defeat and destroy the said villain. Almost indestructible and superhumanly strong, each villain is programmed with specific weapons and weaknesses based on that villain's "theme"; e.g., "Killshot's" Achilles' Heel was being sprayed with water, The Boss would "fire" people with exploding pink slips and his weak link was red ink, The Evil Shirley's was dirt and she would be wiped out by having a house fall on her, The Camp Counselor would get burned by being hit with charcoal and would be killed off by an arrow shot right through the  bulls-eye on his T-shirt, The Practical Joker could only be defeated by his master prank being foiled, The Divorce Attorney was a being that sucked up electricity and distributed it in the form of lightning bolts (her weakness was being hit with a foam-rubber arrow), The Motivational Speaker literally ate Bologna sausage and killed people with a gun that ejected audiocassettes and would reduce them to nothing but his audiotape, and he could only be destroyed by eating his own words. He could be slowed down with shots from a paintball gun.

Another weekly bad guy was a corrupted car mechanic that tasered people with a calculator and would be destroyed by seeing his own reflection. And of course, The Garbage Man was damaged by cleaning products and The Orthodontist (as well as his assistant) had an aversion to sugar. All the henchmen were instantly obliterated—going up in smoke and blue light when the Jackal's evil weekly master scheme was foiled. The Jackal's own vice was being hit with a baseball—the very one autographed by Bobby Mercer that Gus got from the only baseball game he ever went to with his own father. Jackal is present in every episode, commanding the other villains and vexing the heroes, usually with a glass of champagne in hand.

Characters

Main
The following characters appear in every episode:

 Dr. Gus Lloyd/The Cold-Steel Kid (James Calvert)
 Lauren Ashborne/The Girl (Cynthia Gibb)
 Sebastian Jackal/Dr. Jordan Kenneth Lloyd (Christopher Lloyd)
 Peter Rucker (Stephen T. Kay)

Guests: One-time villains
Each of the following characters appears in only one episode:

 "Killshot" Tom Rothman (Tom Rathman)
 "One Mean Mother," Shirley Ashborne/Evil Shirley (Shirley Jones)
 "The Orthodontist," Dr. Kramer (Christopher Neame)
 "The Dental Hygienist," Sharon (Dr. Kramer's assistant) (Marjorie Monaghan)
 "The Boss," Mr. Metcalf (LeVar Burton)
 "The Divorce Lawyer," Courtney Lake (Victoria Rowell)
 "The Trash Man," Roy Hopkins (Mike Starr)
 "The Motivational Speaker," Nathan Abrams (Dwight Schultz)
 "The Practical Joker," Danny Schlecht (Brent Spiner)
 "The Camp Counselor," Chuck Manley (Anthony Michael Hall)
 "The Car Mechanic," Ross Logan (Mark Pellegrino)
 "The Ex-Girlfriend," Belinda Madigan (Beth Toussaint)

Episodes

Home media
On June 11, 2018, Visual Entertainment released the complete series on DVD in Region 1.

References

External links
 

1990s American science fiction television series
1995 American television series debuts
1997 American television series endings
English-language television shows
UPN original programming
Television series by CBS Studios
Television shows about video games